California's 17th district may refer to:

 California's 17th congressional district
 California's 17th State Assembly district
 California's 17th State Senate district